DeQwan Young (born November 12, 1986) is a former American football defensive back. He was also the defensive backs coach for the Seton Hill University.

College career
Young started all 11 games in the defensive backfield in each of his four seasons at St. Joseph's and finished his career in 2007 with 15 interceptions, 196 tackles, and 57 passed defended. He was an All-Star in the Division II Cactus Bowl and was selected to the First Team All-Great Lakes Football Conference and the Second Team All-Northwest Region squads. He was considered a draft prospect for the 2008 NFL Draft, but didn't hear his name called on draft day.

Professional career

Manchester Wolves
It was announced on October 30, 2008, that Young would be joining the Wolves. Young ended up never playing a down for the Wolves.

Wisconsin Wolfpack
On April 3, 2009, Young decided to sign with the Wisconsin Wolfpack of the Continental Indoor Football League. He played 2 seasons for the Wolfpack, before they folded following the 2010 season.

Johnstown Generals
In 2011, he signed with the Johnstown Generals. In week 14, he was named the defensive player of the week after having 3 interceptions, two of which was returned for a touchdown. He led the league with interceptions (16) despite only playing 12 games.
Young returned to Johnstown for the 2012 season.

Missouri Monsters
In 2013, Young signed with the Missouri Monsters.

Erie Explosion
In 2014, Young signed with the Erie Explosion of the Continental Indoor Football League.

Controversy
After not winning the UIFL Defensive Player of the Year award, Young dropped a series of YouTube videos on June 9, 2011 and June 18, 2011   calling out several league officials, coaches, and Quarterbacks.

On February 11, 2014, Young made a potential career ending tackle on Northern Kentucky River Monsters Quarterback, Jared Lorenzen. Northern Kentucky River Monsters Owner, Jill Chitwood, made a comments in a USA Today article  hinting that Erie Explosion players cheered while Lorenzen went down injured after Young's hit. Lorenzen would pass away in 2019 after never playing another game of football after this hit by Young.

References

1986 births
Living people
American football defensive backs
Erie Explosion players
Johnstown Generals players
Manchester Wolves players
Missouri Monsters players
Seton Hill Griffins football coaches
Saint Joseph's Pumas football players
Wisconsin Wolfpack players
Sportspeople from Pontiac, Michigan
Players of American football from Michigan